Fengxiang painted clay sculptures are a folk art in form Fengxiang County, Baoji city, Shaanxi Province. It is called “Ni Huo” by local people.

Fengxiang, called YongZhou in ancient times, was an ancient town in Shaanxi Province. Before Qin Shi Huang, the first emperor of the Qin dynasty), unified China in 221 B.C., the town was the capital of the Qin Kingdom for more than three hundred years.

Clay sculpture has been handed down among the people for about three thousand years. These sculptures are made from the special clay called “Ban Ban Tu,” found only in Fengxiang County, northwest of Xi’an. The clay is well-suited for making sculptures because it is very sticky and doesn’t crack easily after it dries. The figurines are made of this local clay mixed with pulp, then painted after shaping. The craft of making the painted clay-figurines of Fengxiang has a recorded history of more than three hundred years. According to folk-lore, however, the figurines first appeared some six hundred years ago.

The subjects of the figurines span a wide range of bold and brief shapes of wild exaggeration and bright colours with a strong local flavour. They are well received by the local people, who put them as toys and symbols of good fortune and happiness. Every time when the lunar New Year draws near, the local handicraftsmen, with the beautifully painted clay-figurines on shoulders or in hand, would converge on the market and set up stalls in meandering lines. This makes the country fair during the festival more flourishing and exciting. Infused with simple and sincere feelings of the laboring people, the painted clay-figurines reflected the superb creative ability in art of the peasants and are typical articles of folk art. They not only attract the attention of artists, but also appeal very much to people of various fields both at home and abroad

Large clay tiger for hanging are frequent examples of Fengxiang’s clay sculpture works. Tiger is believed to protect families from evil spirits and bring fortune and safety to children. Large in size and rich in colors, it looks powerful and majestic. Auspicious designs like peony (wealth), pomegranate (having lots of children), “Buddha’s hand” (happiness and kindness), lotus (holy symbol of Buddhism), golden fish (surplus), peach (longevity), and fylfot, or swastika (endless happiness) are drawn on its body, and followed by bright colors.   Frog design sculpture with “Five Poisons” is a unique design popular in rural areas. Ancient Chinese generally called the scorpion, centipede, snake, gecko, and toad the “Five Poisons.” The frog is of the same family as the toad in the “Five Poisons.” People put this hanging frog with “Five Poisons” on children’s beds, with their venomous powers, to keep away evil spirits and disaster from children.

Culture in Shaanxi
Folk art
Chinese pottery
Qin (state)